Guntersville Municipal Airport , also known as Joe Starnes Field, is a city-owned public-use airport located three nautical miles (6 km) northeast of the central business district of Guntersville, a city in Marshall County, Alabama, United States. According to the FAA's National Plan of Integrated Airport Systems for 2009–2013, it is categorized as a general aviation facility.

Facilities and aircraft 
It has one runway designated 07/25 with an asphalt surface measuring 5,005 by 75 feet (1,525 x 23 m).

For the 12-month period ending July 13, 2009, the airport had 9,217 aircraft operations, an average of 25 per day: 99% general aviation and 1% military. At that time there were 39 aircraft based at this airport: 90% single-engine, 5% multi-engine and 5% helicopter.

References

External links 
 Aerial image as of 7 March 1997 from USGS The National Map
 Airfield photos for 8A1 from Civil Air Patrol
 

Airports in Alabama
Transportation buildings and structures in Marshall County, Alabama